Saal is a municipality in the Vorpommern-Rügen district, in Mecklenburg-Vorpommern, Germany.
The community is under administration of the small city of Barth. Saal has first been documented in a deed of the city of Barth in the year of 1255. At this time there was an already abandoned Slavic castle by the mouth of the Saal creek into the Saal “bodden”. The population around 1255 consisted of indigenous Slav, migrants from Westphalia and Denmark. The first church already existed and was completely made of wood and sanctified to the “Holy Cross”.

From today's village Tempel, at the time a commandery, knights templar arrived at Saal. The order of knights was in search to expanding Northeast, and had to take provisions securing its continuity as the Holy Land was lost.

The order induced the erection of the church, which until this date dominates impressively the scenery and gives a different impression of Gothic architecture. Everything at this church is characterized by ‘shiftings’: windows, portals. The frayed walls are evidence of both planned or symbolic annexes and continued constructions.

The entry to the underground walkway, behind the altar, can still be seen. It is said to end somewhere by the “bodden”. Underneath the bell tower (1731) standing aside from the actual church, is a hollow space, which however, had never been explored. According to the legend a part of the templar treasure was brought here around 1300. One of the templar stole a part of the treasure and hid it in one of the column foundations. It was said to be the vanished imperial regalia of John Lackland, which he lost in unclear circumstances in 1216.

Legend:

Until 1309 the templar rebuilt the castle at the „bodden“ and used it as a port facility. Today, only the castle ramparts testify of the once great times. The Vitalian Brotherhood under Stoertebeker (.../succession order of the templar in Portugal) had used the castle until 1391 and are said to have brought the treasure under the bell tower to this place. After they were involved in a fight with the Danes on the Ribnitz Sea, they had to flee and never returned to Saal. The treasure is said to be still somewhere there. Today the templar in Saal are forgotten; only Stoertebeker is sometimes spoken about.

Suggestion:

Who ever comes to Saal, should not miss visiting an ancient stone circle, the apostle stones.

References